= Usman M. Bugaje =

Nigerian politician

Usman M. Bugaje is a Nigerian politician from Katsina State, born in September 1951. He represented the Jibia/Kaita Federal Constituency in the National Assembly, serving as a member of the Peoples Democratic Party (PDP) from 2003 to 2007 in the House of Representatives. He also served as Special Adviser (Political) to the Vice President.

He was nominated as the vice-presidential candidate of the Social Democratic Party (SDP) in 2026.
